Evripidis Giakos (born 9 April 1991) is a Greek professional footballer who plays as an attacking midfielder for Super League 2 club Anagennisi Karditsa.

Career
Born in Ioannina, Giakos began playing football with PAS Giannina. On 4 January 2009, he made his professional debut for PAS Giannina in a  match against Agrotikos Asteras.

References

External links

myplayer.gr

1991 births
Living people
Greek footballers
Association football defenders
Football League (Greece) players
Super League Greece players
Gamma Ethniki players
Super League Greece 2 players
PAS Giannina F.C. players
Doxa Kranoula F.C. players
Athlitiki Enosi Larissa F.C. players
AO Chania F.C. players
Apollon Larissa F.C. players
Anagennisi Karditsa F.C. players
Footballers from Ioannina